The government ministries of Cameroon were defined by Decree number 2004/320 of December 8, 2004. The Cameroon government consists of the following ministries:

Ministry of Culture
Ministry of Commerce
Ministry of Communication
Ministry of Defense
Ministry of Housing and Urban Development
Ministry of Finance
Ministry of Basic Education
Ministry of Livestock Fisheries and Animal Industries
Ministry of Employment and Vocational Training
Ministry of Energy and Water Resources
Ministry Of Secondary Education
Ministry of Higher education
Ministry of Environment and Nature Protection in Cameroon
Ministry of Public Service and Administrative Reforms
Ministry of Forestry and Wildlife
Ministry of Industry, Mines and Technological Development
Ministry of Youth Affairs and Civic Education
Ministry of Economy, Planning and Regional Development
Ministry of Small and Medium-sized Enterprises, Social Economy and Handicrafts
Ministry of Posts and Telecommunications
Ministry of Women's Empowerment and the Family
Ministry of Scientific Research and Innovation
Ministry of External Relations
Ministry of Public Health
Ministry of Sports and Physical Education
Ministry of Tourism
Ministry of Transport
Ministry of Labor and Social Security
Ministry of Public Works
 Ministry of Justice
 Ministry of Territorial Administration 
 Ministry of Decentralisation and Local Development

References

Government of Cameroon
Lists of government ministries